The 2019 MLS SuperDraft was the twentieth SuperDraft conducted by Major League Soccer. The SuperDraft is typically held in conjunction with the annual January United Soccer Coaches convention, which in 2019 was held in Chicago, Illinois. The first two rounds of the 2019 SuperDraft were held on January 11, 2019. Rounds three and four were held via conference call on January 14, 2019.

Format
The SuperDraft format has remained constant throughout its history and closely resembles that of the NFL Draft:

Any expansion teams receive the first picks. In May 2018, MLS named FC Cincinnati as an expansion team to begin play in 2019. 
Non-playoff clubs receive the next picks in reverse order of prior season finish.
Teams that made the MLS Cup Playoffs are then ordered by which round of the playoffs they are eliminated.
The winners of the MLS Cup are given the last selection, and the losers the penultimate selection.

Player selection

Round 1

Round 2

Round 3

Round 4

Trades 
Round 1

Round 2

Round 3

Round 4

Notable undrafted players

Homegrown players

Players who signed outside of MLS

Summary

Selections by college athletic conference

Schools with multiple draft selections

References 

Major League Soccer drafts
SuperDraft
MLS SuperDraft
2010s in Chicago
Soccer in Chicago
Events in Chicago
MLS SuperDraft